Jaleswar is a town in the north east state of Assam, India.

Jaleswar, Assam (Vidhan Sabha constituency) is one of the 126 assembly constituencies of Assam Legislative Assembly in India. Sahab uddin Ahmed from  All India United Democratic Front is the current legislator from Jaleswar constituency. Jaleswar is also part of Dhubri Lok Sabha constituency.

Demographics

Religion

Languages 
Assamese and  English Language is used for and official purpose.

References

 
Goalpara district